Dmitry Epstein (born 10 August 1993) is a Dutch pair skater. He has won four senior international medals with his skating partner, Nika Osipova.

Earlier in his career, he skated with his twin sister, Rachel. The two competed at three consecutive World Junior Championships.

Personal life 
Dmitry Epstein and his twin sister, Rachel, were born on 10 August 1993 in Enschede, Netherlands.

Career

Early years 
Epstein began learning to skate in 2003. Early in his career, he skated in partnership with his twin sister, Rachel. The two competed in novice pairs during the 2008–09 season and moved up to juniors the following season. They represented the Netherlands at three consecutive World Junior Championships (2011, 2012, and 2013).

The Epstein twins trained in Zoetermeer, Netherlands; Stavanger, Norway; and Moscow, Russia. Their coaches included Alexander Artyshenko, Arina Ushakova, Pavel Kitashev, Zsolt Kerekes, Dmitri Boyenko, Aneta Kowalska, and Chris Laheij.

Beginning with the 2018–19 season, Epstein skated two seasons with Finland's Liubov Efimenko for the Netherlands. In February 2019, making their international debut, they finished seventh at the Bavarian Open and fourth at the International Challenge Cup. In September, they placed eleventh at the 2019 CS Nebelhorn Trophy. The two were coached by Dmitri Kaplun in The Hague.

2020–21 season 
Epstein teamed up with Russia's Nika Osipova after contacting her via a website, IcePartnerSearch. He said, "It was in the middle of the pandemic, so we couldn't meet or try out together on the ice if it would work. We wanted to lose as little time as possible, so as soon as traveling became possible again, she immediately came to The Hague. We immediately started skating together and since then she has stayed in the Netherlands."

Osipova/Epstein decided to represent the Netherlands. In February 2021, they placed sixth at the International Challenge Cup, their sole international event that season.

2021–22 season 
In October, Osipova/Epstein placed 15th at the 2021 CS Finlandia Trophy. In November, they were second of two pairs at the NRW Trophy. They won bronze at the Bavarian Open in January 2022 and at the International Challenge Cup in February.

2022–23 season 
Epstein continued to be affected by lung problems related to long COVID, having first developed the disease two years earlier.

In November 2022, Osipova/Epstein won silver at the Ice Challenge in Austria. Later that month, they competed at the 2022 Grand Prix of Espoo, to which they were invited a couple of weeks before the event. Making their Grand Prix debut, they placed fifth in Finland.

Osipova/Epstein edged out Daria Danilova / Michel Tsiba to claim the Netherlands' only pair skating berth at the 2023 European Championships.

Programs

With Nika Osipova

With Liubov Efimenko

With Rachel Epstein

Competitive highlights 
GP: Grand Prix; CS: Challenger Series; JGP: Junior Grand Prix

Pairs with Nika Osipova

Pairs with Liubov Efimenko

Pairs with Rachel Epstein

Men's singles

References

External links 
 
 

1993 births
Dutch male pair skaters
Living people
Sportspeople from Enschede